A necropolis (plural necropolises, necropoles, necropoleis, necropoli) is a large, designed cemetery with elaborate tomb monuments. The name stems from the Ancient Greek  nekropolis, literally meaning "city of the dead". 

The term usually implies a separate burial site at a distance from a city, as opposed to tombs within cities, which were common in various places and periods of history. They are different from grave fields, which did not have structures or markers above the ground. While the word is most commonly used for ancient sites, the name was revived in the early 19th century and applied to planned city cemeteries, such as the Glasgow Necropolis.

Necropoleis in the ancient world

Egypt 

Ancient Egypt is noted for multiple necropoleis. Ancient Egyptian funerary practices and beliefs about the afterlife led to the construction of several extensive necropoleis to secure and provision the dead in the hereafter. These necropoleis are therefore major archaeological sites for Egyptology.  

Probably the best-known ancient Egyptian necropolis is the Giza Necropolis. Made famous by the Great Pyramid of Giza, which was included in the Seven Wonders of the Ancient World, the necropolis includes three major pyramid tombs of Old Kingdom kings and several smaller pyramids related to the royal burials, as well as mastabas (a typical royal tomb of the early Dynastic period) and tombs and graveyards for lesser personages. 

Almost as well-known as Giza is the Theban Necropolis, on the west bank of the Nile at Thebes (modern Luxor). This necropolis is known for the rock-cut tombs of the Valley of the Kings, the Valley of the Queens, and the various tombs of nobles and others from the New Kingdom onward. The Theban Necropolis is home to some of the few Ancient Egyptian tombs that remained essentially intact until discovery by modern archaeologists, including the Tomb of Tutankhamun and the Tomb of Kha and Merit.

Other ancient Egyptian necropoleis of note are the necropolis of Saqqara, home to the Step Pyramid of Djoser and other royal burials; the necropolis of Dahshur, site of the Red Pyramid of Sneferu, the oldest "true" pyramid; and Abydos, site of a necropolis containing burials from the Predynastic through the Late Period. A pair of small necropoleis of Theban-style rock-cut tombs started to take shape in the wadis east of Akhetaten (modern Amarna) during the Amarna Period of the New Kingdom; while it appears that the tombs were not ultimately used for burials due to the collapse of the Amarna regime about 20 years after the foundation of Akhetaten, the tomb decorations provide much information about that era of ancient Egyptian history.

Etruria 

The Etruscans took the concept of a "city of the dead" quite literally. The typical tomb at the Banditaccia necropolis at Cerveteri consists of a tumulus which covers one or more rock-cut subterranean tombs. These tombs had multiple chambers and were elaborately decorated like contemporary houses. The arrangement of the tumuli in a grid of streets gave it an appearance similar to the cities of the living. The art historian Nigel Spivey considers the name cemetery inadequate and argues that only the term necropolis can do justice to these sophisticated burial sites. Etruscan necropoli were usually located on hills or slopes of hills.

Mycenae 
In the Mycenean Greek period predating ancient Greece, burials could be performed inside the city. In Mycenae, for example, the royal tombs were located in a precinct within the city walls. This changed during the ancient Greek period when necropoleis usually lined the roads outside a city. There existed some degree of variation within the ancient Greek world however. Sparta was notable for continuing the practice of burial within the city.

Persia 

Though it is severely damaged, it depicts a faint image of a man with unusual headgear and is thought to be Elamite in origin. The depiction is part of a larger image, most of which was removed at the command of Bahram II. Four tombs belonging to Achaemenid kings are carved out of the rock face at a considerable height above the ground. The tombs are known locally as the "Persian crosses", after the shape of the facades of the tombs. Later, Sassanian kings added a series of rock reliefs below the tombs.

Lydia 

The site of Bin Tepe served as a necropolis for Sardis, the capital of the Lydian Empire. It consists of over 100 tumuli including the monumental Tumulus of Alyattes which was commented on by ancient writers including Herodotus and still marks the landscape today. Though Lydian elites also used other burial styles, tumuli are so numerous throughout Lydia that they are used to track settlement patterns. The style was adopted around 600 BC, likely inspired by similar Phrygian tombs at Gordion. It continued after the Persian conquest of Lydia, into the Hellenistic and Roman eras.

Modern necropoleis 
Necropoleis have been built in modern times. The world's largest remaining operating necropolis from the Victorian era, for example, is Rookwood Necropolis, in New South Wales, Australia. A modern era example is Colma, California, United States.

See also
List of necropoleis
Funerary art
Catacombs

References

 
Cemeteries